Bootle Village railway station was a station in Bootle, Lancashire, England. The station opened in 1850 on the southern side of Merton Road and closed in 1876.

References

Disused railway stations in the Metropolitan Borough of Sefton
Former Lancashire and Yorkshire Railway stations
Railway stations in Great Britain opened in 1850
Railway stations in Great Britain closed in 1876